Prolabeops is a genus of cyprinid fish endemic to Cameroon.  There are two species in this genus.

Species
 Prolabeops melanhypopterus (Pellegrin, 1928)
 Prolabeops nyongensis Daget, 1984

References
 

Cyprinidae genera
Cyprinid fish of Africa

Endemic fauna of Cameroon